"Big Decision" is a 1987 single by That Petrol Emotion. The song reached no. 43 on the UK charts, and no. 27 on the US Dance Club charts.

The song ranked number 3 among "Tracks of the Year" for 1987 in the annual NME critics' poll.

Track listing

7"

12"

10" (Limited Edition)

Charts

Personnel 
 Steve Mack -  vocals
 John O'Neill -  guitar
 Raymond O'Gorman -  guitar
 Damian O`Neill -  bass guitar
 Ciaran McLaughlin -  drums

References

1987 songs
That Petrol Emotion songs
Songs written by John O'Neill (guitarist)